Mokomokai, or Toi moko, are the preserved heads of Māori, the indigenous people of New Zealand, where the faces have been decorated by tā moko tattooing. They became valuable trade items during the Musket Wars of the early 19th century.

Moko

Moko facial tattoos were traditional in Māori culture until about the mid 19th century when their use began to disappear, although there has been something of a revival from the late 20th century. In pre-European Māori culture they denoted high social status. There were generally only men that had full facial moko, though high-ranked women often had moko on their lips and chins. Moko tattoos served as identifying connection between an individual and their ancestors.

Moko marked rites of passage for people of chiefly rank, as well as significant events in their lives. Each moko was unique and contained information about the person's rank, tribe, lineage, occupation and exploits. Moko were expensive to obtain and elaborate moko were usually limited to chiefs and high-ranked warriors. Moreover, the art of moko, the people who created and incised the designs, as well as the moko themselves, were surrounded by strict tapu and protocol.

Mokomokai
When someone with moko died, often the head would be preserved. The brain and eyes were removed, with all orifices sealed with flax fibre and gum. The head was then boiled or steamed in an oven before being smoked over an open fire and dried in the sun for several days. It was then treated with shark oil. Such preserved heads, mokomokai, would be kept by their families in ornately carved boxes and brought out only for sacred ceremonies.

The heads of enemy chiefs killed in battle were also preserved; these mokomokai, being considered trophies of war, would be displayed on the marae and mocked. They were important in diplomatic negotiations between warring tribes, with the return and exchange of mokomokai being an essential precondition for peace.

Musket Wars

Trading for these heads with Western colonisers apparently began with Sir Joseph Banks, the botanist on HMB Endeavour, where he traded old linen drawers (underwear) for the head of a 14-year-old boy. It has since been suggested that this trade may have not been conducted voluntarily, as it is reported that Banks had a musket aimed at the leader of the Maori tribe as he was reluctant to relinquish the head of his ancestor. The head was traded as a "curio" and a fascination with the heads began to grow. This continued with Mokomokai heads being traded for muskets and the subsequent Musket Wars. During this period of social destabilisation, mokomokai became commercial trade items which could be sold as curios, artworks and as museum specimens which fetched high prices in Europe and America, and which could be bartered for firearms and ammunition.

The demand for firearms was such that tribes carried out raids on their neighbours to acquire more heads to trade for them. While most early mokomokai sold to Europeans were slain warriors, eventually demand from European traders outstripped supply, so the heads of slaves and prisoners were tattooed (though with meaningless motifs rather than genuine moko) in order to provide heads to order. The peak years of the trade in mokomokai were from 1820 to 1831. In 1831 the Governor of New South Wales issued a proclamation banning further trade in heads out of New Zealand, and during the 1830s the demand for firearms diminished because every surviving group was fully armed. By 1840 when the Treaty of Waitangi was signed, and New Zealand became a British colony, the export trade in mokomokai had virtually ended, along with a decline in the use of moko in Māori society, although occasional small-scale trade continued for several years.

Robley collection

Major-General Horatio Gordon Robley was a British army officer and artist who served in New Zealand during the New Zealand Wars in the 1860s. A talented illustrator, he was interested in ethnology and fascinated by the art of tattooing. He wrote the classic text on the subject of moko, Moko; or Maori Tattooing, which was published in 1896. After he returned to England he built up a notable collection of 35 to 40 mokomokai which he later offered to sell to the New Zealand Government. When the offer was declined, most of the collection was sold to the American Museum of Natural History.

The collection was repatriated to Te Papa Tongarewa in 2014.

Repatriation
More recently there has been a campaign to repatriate to New Zealand the hundreds of mokomokai held in museums and private collections around the world, either to be returned to their relatives or to the Museum of New Zealand for storage, though not display. It has had some success, though many mokomokai remain overseas and the campaign is ongoing.

References

Further reading
 Robley, H.G. (1896). Moko; Maori Tattooing. Chapman & Hall: London. Full text at the NZETC.

External links
 Mokomokai - the documentary

History of New Zealand
Human trophy collecting
Polynesian tattooing
Māori art
Māori words and phrases